Buzz is the second album by Keller Williams, released in 1996.  It covers many genres of music such as world beat, reggae, bluegrass and rock.

Track listing
 Sunny Rain 4:07
 Sally Sullivan 5:01
 Relaxation Station 4:06
 Fuel For The Road 4:49
 Stinky Green 5:46
 Yoni 6:06
 Over Dub 1:40
 Anyhow Anyway 5:24
 Inhale To The Chief 3:02
 Killer Waves 4:51
 Best Feeling 6:04
 Same Ol' 4:16
 Molly Maloy  1:44

Credits
John Alagía - Assistant Engineer
Doug Derryberry - Guitar, Piano (Electric), Engineer
Craig Dougald - Marimba
Gibb Droll - Guitar (Electric)
Tracee Harris - Artwork
Larry Keel - Guitar on Inhale to the Chief and Sunny Rain
Will Lee - Banjo
Danny Knicely - Mandolin
Sander Siemons - Violin
Pete Mathis - Piano (Electric)
Andy Waldeck - Bass
Brian Durrett - Bass
Clif Franck - Drums
Noel White - Drums
Keller Williams - Arranger, Bongos, Vocals, Guitar (10 String), Shaker

References

1996 albums
Keller Williams albums